Ouro Modi is a rural commune and village in the Cercle of Mopti in the Mopti Region of Mali.

References

External links
.

Communes of Mopti Region